Eudonia strigalis, the striped eudonia moth, is a moth in the family Crambidae. It was described by Harrison Gray Dyar Jr. in 1906. It is found in North America, where it has been recorded from Nova Scotia to southern Ontario and south to Florida.

The wingspan is 13–17 mm. The forewings are light dappled grey with short black longitudinal streaks. The hindwings are shiny grey. Adults are on wing year round in the southern part of the range. In the north, adults are on wing from May to September.

References

Moths described in 1906
Eudonia